Mount Desert Island High School (MDIHS) is a public high school in Bar Harbor, Maine, United States. It was established in 1968 and is part of the Mount Desert Island Regional School District.

History 
Mount Desert Island High School opened in fall 1968, absorbing students from Bar Harbor High School, Pemetic High School and Mount Desert High School (which previously merged with Gilman). Consolidation votes in 1949 and 1959 failed, but a successful 1965 vote started the process. Proponents of the consolidation stressed more opportunities for students and a better preparation for the professional life, while dissenters stressed a loss of local identity. After the consolidation, students from the three high schools stayed in cliques according to geographic area.

In 2019, the school converted to relying solely on solar energy.

Athletics 
Beginning in 2020, the Trojan football team played in an 8-man format. They had previously played in the Big 11 Football Conference.

The school achieved the following state championships:

 Swimming and Diving (boys) — 2004, 2005, 2006, 2007, 2008, 2009, 2018, 2019, 2020
 Swimming and Diving(girls) — 1982, 1989, 2011, 2020
 Tennis (girls) — 1987, 1988, 1989
 Track and Field (boys, outdoor) — 2018 (tie), 2021
 Track and Field (boys, indoor) — 2017 
 Track and Field (girls, indoor)  — 1980, 1981, 1982 
 Cross Country (girls)  — 1976, 1980, 1981, 1982, 2006, 2011, 2012, 2013, 2021
 Cross Country (boys)  — 1972, 1973, 1986
 Soccer (girls)  — 1997
 Basketball (boys)  — 2017
 Basketball (girls)  — 1997, 2001, 2002, 2003

Music 
The school fields three vocal ensembles a concert choir and two competitive show choirs: a mixed-gender group and the all-female "Trojan Trebles". The school also has many instrumental ensembles including a pep band, symphonic band, string orchestra, competition jazz big band, and several jazz combos.

Drama 

MDI has a theater program that produces three or four shows a year. A fall musical, winter competition one-act play, and one or two spring plays. 

MDI Drama has achieved the following state championships. 

One-Act Play — 1969, 1971, 1972, 1974, 1977, 1978, 1983, 1996, 2017, 2018

Notable alumni 
 Matthew Dunlap, politician

References

External links 
 

Bar Harbor, Maine
Mount Desert Island
Schools in Hancock County, Maine
Public high schools in Maine
Educational institutions established in 1968
1968 establishments in Maine